Lindsaea linearis is known as the screw fern, as the fronds may have a twisting appearance. A small fern of widespread distribution in many parts of Australia. Found in a variety of habitats, often near swamps or moist places. By rocks, heathland or open forest. It has a dark stem, unlike the similar necklace fern, which is green.

The screw fern was first described by Swedish botanist Olof Swartz in 1801, and still bears its original name.

References

External links

linearis
Ferns of Australasia
Ferns of Australia
Ferns of New Zealand
Flora of New South Wales
Flora of Norfolk Island
Plants described in 1801
Taxa named by Olof Swartz